Camille Combal (born 18 September 1981) is a French television and radio presenter. He was the co-host of Touche pas à mon poste ! for six seasons.

Personal life
Combal was born on 18 September 1981 in Gap, Hautes-Alpes. He went to primary school in Les Orres, and secondary school in Embrun. He studied management at Aix-Marseille University. In 2019, he married Marie in Aix-en-Provence.

Career
In 2006, Combal started as an intern at Fun Radio. In 2008, he joined Virgin Radio, hosting their morning programme alongside Sébastien Cauet. He worked at Virgin Radio until June 2018, when he left to join TF1.

In 2008, Combal also began presenting the Canal+ programme L'édition spéciale. In 2009, Combal joined TV channel W9, and in 2010, he joined M6, working alongside Estelle Denis. He presented the C8 talkshow Touche pas à mon poste ! alongside Cyril Hanouna, before leaving the show in 2018 after six seasons. He also hosted one series of Il en pense quoi Camille ? between 2016 and 2017.

Combal has been the presenter of TF1 programme Danse avec les stars since season 9. Since 2019, he has presented Mask Singer, and Qui veut gagner des millions ?, the French version of Who Wants to Be a Millionaire?. As part of the handover for Qui veut gagner des millions ?, the 2019 series started with a celebrity special hosted by Jean-Pierre Foucault in which Combal was a contestant. He also hosts his own show, Plan C, which uses carpool karaoke. During the COVID-19 pandemic, Combal hosted episodes of Qui veut gagner des millions ? from his living room.

Awards
In 2015, Combal was second in the TV Notes award for best presenter, for his work on Touche pas à mon poste !, with 799,000 votes. He won the 2016 TV Notes award for best presenter.

References

1981 births
French game show hosts
French television talk show hosts
Living people
People from Gap, Hautes-Alpes
Danse avec les stars
Who Wants to Be a Millionaire?
Aix-Marseille University alumni